The Oman national futsal team is controlled by the Oman Football Association, the governing body for futsal in Oman and represents the country in international futsal competitions.

Tournaments

FIFA Futsal World Cup
 1989 – Did not enter
 1992 – Did not qualify
 1996-2016 – Did not enter
 2020 – Did not quality

AFC Futsal Championship

Arab Futsal Championship

GCC Futsal Cup

Results
http://old.futsalplanet.com/matches

2020 AFC Futsal Championship qualification

2022 AFC Futsal Asian Cup qualification

21/09/2019 - Isa Town (BAH)
- Friendly Match
Bahrain 	vs 	Oman 	1 - 3 		

20/09/2019 - Isa Town (BAH)
- Friendly Match
Bahrain 	vs 	Oman 	1 - 1 

09/10/2018 - Kalba (UAE)
- Friendly Match
UAE 	vs 	Oman 	3 - 2 

08/10/2018 - Kalba (UAE)
- Friendly Match
UAE 	vs 	Oman 	3 - 1 

08/09/2017 - Sharjah (UAE)
- Friendly Match
UAE 	vs 	Oman 	4 - 1 

07/09/2017 - Sharjah (UAE)
- Friendly Match
UAE 	vs 	Oman 	3 - 1 	

18/03/2015 - Isa Town (BAH)
- Isa Town 2015 - GCC Futsal Championship
Oman 	vs 	UAE 	2 - 3 	

17/03/2015 - Isa Town (BAH)
- Isa Town 2015 - GCC Futsal Championship
Kuwait 	vs 	Oman 	5 - 0 

15/03/2015 - Isa Town (BAH)
- Isa Town 2015 - GCC Futsal Championship
Oman 	vs 	Bahrain 	3 - 1 

14/03/2015 - Isa Town (BAH)
- Isa Town 2015 - GCC Futsal Championship
Saudi Arabia 	vs 	Oman 	3 - 5 

12/03/2015 - Isa Town (BAH)
- Isa Town 2015 - GCC Futsal Championship
Oman 	vs 	UAE 	0 - 2 

11/03/2015 - Isa Town (BAH)
- Isa Town 2015 - GCC Futsal Championship
Qatar 	vs 	Oman 	4 - 3 

10/03/2015 - Isa Town (BAH)
- Isa Town 2015 - GCC Futsal Championship
Oman 	vs 	Kuwait 	4 - 6 

06/03/2015 - Isa Town (BAH)
- Friendly Match
Bahrain 	vs 	Oman 	4 - 5 

27/02/2015 - Dubai (UAE)
- Friendly Match
UAE 	vs 	Oman 	3 - 5 

03/05/1992 - - (IRI)
- FIFA World Futsal Ch. - Hong Kong 1992 (Q) (2nd)
Iran 	vs 	Oman 	6 - 2 

01/05/1992 - - (IRI)
- FIFA World Futsal Ch. - Hong Kong 1992 (Q) (2nd)
Oman 	vs 	Kuwait 	12 - 3

References

External links
 Official Oman Football Association Website

Oman
futsal
Futsal in Oman